Madeline de Jesús (born November 4, 1957 in Brooklyn, New York) is a retired female track and field athlete from Puerto Rico, who competed in the women's long jump and triple jump during her career. Her personal best (6.96 metres) in the long jump was set on July 24, 1988 in Mexico City. She finished fifth in the long jump at the 1987 Pan American Games. De Jesús twin sister Margaret de Jesús also competed at the 1984 Summer Olympics, in the women's 400 metres. Madeline is currently living in Belgium where she's active as a sports teacher and coach.

Olympic cheating 
After Puerto Rico's Madeline de Jesus got injured while competing in the long jump, she was unable to run in the 4×400-meter relay at the 1984 Los Angeles Games. She came up with a plan and enlisted her identical twin sister, Margaret, as an imposter for a qualifying heat. Margaret ran the second leg of the qualifier, and the team advanced but when the chief coach of the Puerto Rican team learned of the ruse, he pulled his team out of the final.

Achievements

See also
 List of Puerto Ricans

References

External links
 
 

1957 births
Living people
Puerto Rican female long jumpers
Puerto Rican triple jumpers
Puerto Rican twins
Olympic track and field athletes of Puerto Rico
Athletes (track and field) at the 1984 Summer Olympics
Athletes (track and field) at the 1988 Summer Olympics
Pan American Games competitors for Puerto Rico
Athletes (track and field) at the 1979 Pan American Games
Athletes (track and field) at the 1987 Pan American Games
Place of birth missing (living people)
Twin sportspeople
Central American and Caribbean Games bronze medalists for Puerto Rico
Competitors at the 1982 Central American and Caribbean Games
Central American and Caribbean Games medalists in athletics